The Bessarabian Soviet Socialist Republic or Bessarabian SSR was a revolutionary committee created under the patronage of Soviet Russia to establish a Soviet republic within Bessarabia. The only Bessarabian territory under the committee's control was the town of Bender during the uprising of 27−28 May 1919. While the government was disbanded later in 1919, the idea was revived during the Tatarbunary Uprising, when another committee held control over some villages in southern Bessarabia for a few days in September 1924.

History
The Bessarabian SSR was proclaimed on 5 May 1919 in Odessa at the 2nd Regional Bolshevik Conference as a "Provisional Workers' and Peasants' Government in exile" and established on 11 May 1919 in Tiraspol as an autonomous part of Russian SFSR.  Neither Odessa nor Tiraspol were part of historical Bessarabia. The planned territories included Tiraspol uyezd of Kherson Governorate and Balta and Olgopol uyezds of Podolian Governorate . The self-proclaimed government of the Bessarabian SSR never managed to control any part of Bessarabia, which on 9 April 1918 united with Romania. Soviet authorities did not recognize the Union of Bessarabia with Romania, and the proclamation of the Bessarabian SSR was a political measure aimed at preparing a future invasion of Bessarabia by the Red Army.

The de facto-government had talks with the French military authorities over the military and political settlement but was disbanded in September 1919 after Denikin's army took control of the Odessa region.

The Western European powers recognised the union of Bessarabia and Romania by the Treaty of Paris (1920). However, the United States refused to sign the Treaty on the grounds that Russia was not represented at the conference. This aided the Soviet Union in its continued desire to retake Bessarabia, which it succeeded in doing twenty years later.

Government (Provisional Sovnarkom)
 Chairman – Ivan Krivorukov
 People's Commissar of Interior – Alexander Krusser
 People's Commissar of Land Cultivation – Boris Gumpert
 People's Commissar of War – Boris Gumpert
 People's Commissar of Foreign Affairs – Daniil Ridel/Mihail Gh. Bujor
 People's Commissar of Food – Grigoriy Staryi
 People's Commissar of Enlightenment – G. Kasperovskiy
 People's Commissar of Road Communications – M. Palamarenko
 People's Commissar of Labour – V. Vorontsov
 People's Commissar of Finance – Zelman Ushan
 People's Commissar of Justice – Aleksandr Aladzhalov
 Administration of Affairs – I. Vizgerd
 Representative to the Soviet Ukraine – Asen Khristev

See also
 Provisional Polish Revolutionary Committee
 Bessarabian question
 Moldavian Autonomous Soviet Socialist Republic

Sources

External links
 Bessarabian Soviet Socialist Republic (government). Handbook on history of the Communist Party and the Soviet Union 1898–1991

Post–Russian Empire states
Early Soviet republics
States and territories established in 1919
States and territories disestablished in 1919
Russian Revolution
Provisional governments
Romania–Soviet Union relations
History of Bessarabia
History of Odesa Oblast
Former socialist republics
Communism in Ukraine
Communism in Moldova

Subdivisions of the Russian Soviet Federative Socialist Republic